A number of locally-specific units of measurement were used in the Czech lands to measure length, area, capacity and so on. In 1876, the metric system was made compulsory; however, local measurements and old Viennese measurements were still in use.

Local units during the first half of the 20th century

Length

1 látro was equal to 1.917 m.

Bohemia

There were units specific to Bohemia.

1 stopa ( or střevíc) = 0.296 m

1 sáh = 1.778 m

1 míle = 7.003 km.

Prague

In Prague, one loket was equal to 0.593 m.  The stopa was equal to 0.2965 m.

Moravia

As in Bohemia and Prague, there were specific local units used in Moravia.

1 stopa (or střevíc) = 0.284 m

1 loket = 0.594 m.

Silesia

Similar to the other three parts of the country, local measurements were in use in Silesia.

1 loket = 0.579 m

1 míle = 6.483 km

1 stopa = 0.2895 m.

Area

Bohemia

In Bohemia, one měřice was equal to 1999 m2.  1 korec (also known as the strych or the míra) was equal to 2878 m2.

1 jitro = 2 korec

1 lán = 60 korec.

Capacity

Several different units were used to measure capacity. One Moravian měřice was equal to 70.6 L.  One korec (or one strych) was equal to 93.592 L.

References

Czech culture
Czech Republic